The Department of Civil Aviation of Lao PDR is the civil aviation authority of Laos. The agency, a division of the Ministry of Public Works and Transport, has its headquarters on the property of the Wattay International Airport in Sikhodtabong District, Vientiane.

Notes

 
Government of Laos
Civil aviation authorities in Asia
Civil aviation in Laos
Transport organizations based in Laos